Ivan Lendl defeated John McEnroe in the final, 3–6, 2–6, 6–4, 7–5, 7–5 to win the men's singles tennis title at the 1984 French Open. It was his first major title. It was also McEnroe's first defeat of the season, and his only final appearance at the clay courts of the French Open.

Yannick Noah was the defending champion, but lost to Mats Wilander in the quarterfinals in a rematch of the previous year's final.

Seeds
The seeded players are listed below. Ivan Lendl is the champion; others show the round in which they were eliminated.

  John McEnroe (final)
  Ivan Lendl (champion)
  Jimmy Connors (semifinals)
  Mats Wilander (semifinals)
  Jimmy Arias (quarterfinals)
  Yannick Noah (quarterfinals)
  Andrés Gómez (quarterfinals)
  José Luis Clerc (second round)
  Henrik Sundström (quarterfinals)
  Guillermo Vilas (first round)
  Anders Järryd (fourth round)
  José Higueras (fourth round)
  Juan Aguilera (fourth round)
  Tomáš Šmíd (second round)
  Tim Mayotte (first round)
  Chris Lewis (first round)

Draw

Key
 Q = Qualifier
 WC = Wild card
 LL = Lucky loser
 r = Retired

Finals

Section 1

Section 2

Section 3

Section 4

Section 5

Section 6

Section 7

Section 8

External links
 Association of Tennis Professionals (ATP) – 1984 French Open Men's Singles draw
1984 French Open – Men's draws and results at the International Tennis Federation

Men's Singles
French Open by year – Men's singles
1984 Grand Prix (tennis)